Orthotylus flaviceps is a species of bug in the Miridae family that can be found in the Nearctic and Neotropical realms and on Cyprus.

References

Insects described in 1974
flaviceps